King Mageba kaGumede (c. 1667c. 1745) was an early king of the Zulu Kingdom.

Mageba is said to have succeeded his twin brother King Phunga as leader of the Zulu clan on Phunga's death in about 1727. (This succession between close brothers is reflected by references in Zulu praise poetry such as Zulu ka Phunga no Mageba! (Zulus, children of Phunga and Mageba!) Mageba had at least two sons: Ndaba, who succeeded him, and Mpangazitha. Mpangazitha married his cousin, and it is from this marriage that the Mbatha clan as well as the Mageza clan descends.

External links
Official South African Government language portal: Zulu royal lineage

1660s births
1740s deaths
Zulu kings
18th-century monarchs in Africa

fr:Chefs des Zoulous avant 1816